Ofelia Garcia  is a Cuban-born American artist, curator, art educator and administrator.

Garcia began painting at a young age. She was inspired by her father's souvenir photographs from his travels, a theme that continues into her current work, which is primarily photography-based. In Cuba, Garcia studied art and sculpture at the Escuela Nacional de Bellas Artes. At nineteen, she emigrated to the United States, seeking political asylum during Castro's revolution.

She was a faculty member and Director of the Studio Art Department at Boston College Art Department, served as General Critic at Pennsylvania Academy of the Fine Arts, served as director of The Print Center in Philadelphia, and was president of the Atlanta College of Art, and president of Rosemont College from 1991 to 1995. She was Professor of Art at William Paterson University where she also served as Dean of the College of the Arts and Communications.

Exhibitions
Garcia curated the exhibition Printed by women: A national exhibition of photographs and prints at the Port of History Museum, Philadelphia, Pennsylvania, and co-authored, with Judith K. Brodsky the exhibition catalog.

Honors

 2017–  Enaire Foundation, second prize 
 2011–  Women's Caucus for Art Lifetime Achievement Award.

References

American artists
American people of Cuban descent
American women artists
Women educators
Year of birth missing (living people)
Living people
American art curators
American women curators
21st-century American women artists